Marianne Evelyn Gabriel Faithfull (born 29 December 1946) is an English singer and actress. She achieved popularity in the 1960s with the release of her hit single "As Tears Go By" and became one of the lead female artists during the British Invasion in the United States.

Born in Hampstead, London, Faithfull began her career in 1964 after attending a Rolling Stones party, where she was discovered by Andrew Loog Oldham. Her debut album Marianne Faithfull (1965) (released simultaneously with her album Come My Way) was a commercial success followed by a number of albums on Decca Records. From 1966 to 1970, she had a highly publicised romantic relationship with Mick Jagger. Her popularity was further enhanced by her film roles, such as those in I'll Never Forget What's'isname (1967), The Girl on a Motorcycle (1968), and Hamlet (1969). However, her popularity was overshadowed by personal problems in the 1970s. During that time she was anorexic, homeless, and a heroin addict.

Noted for her distinctive voice, Faithfull's previously melodic and higher-registered vocals (which were prevalent throughout her career in the 1960s) were affected by severe laryngitis, coupled with persistent drug abuse during the 1970s, permanently altering her voice, leaving it raspy, cracked and lower in pitch. This new sound was praised as "whisky soaked" by some critics and seen as having helped to capture the raw emotions expressed in Faithfull's music.

After a long commercial absence, Faithfull made a comeback with the 1979 release of her critically acclaimed album Broken English. The album was a commercial success and marked a resurgence of her musical career. Broken English earned Faithfull a nomination for the Grammy Award for Best Female Rock Vocal Performance and is often regarded as her "definitive recording". She followed this with a series of albums, including Dangerous Acquaintances (1981), A Child's Adventure (1983), and Strange Weather (1987). Faithfull also wrote three books about her life: Faithfull: An Autobiography (1994), Memories, Dreams & Reflections (2007), and Marianne Faithfull: A Life on Record (2014).

Faithfull is listed on VH1's "100 Greatest Women of Rock and Roll" list. She received the World Lifetime Achievement Award at the 2009 Women's World Awards and was made a Commandeur of the Ordre des Arts et des Lettres by the government of France.

Early life

Ancestry 
Faithfull was born in Hampstead, London. Her half-brother is artist Simon Faithfull. Her father, Major Robert Glynn Faithfull, was a British intelligence officer and professor of Italian Literature at Bedford College of London University.

Faithfull's mother Eva was the daughter of an Austro-Hungarian nobleman, Artur Wolfgang, Ritter von Sacher-Masoch. Eva chose to style herself as Eva von Sacher-Masoch, Baroness Erisso. Eva had been a ballerina for the Max Reinhardt Company during her early years, and danced in productions of works by the German theatrical duo Bertolt Brecht and Kurt Weill.

Faithfull's mother had been born in Budapest and moved to Vienna in 1918. The family of Sacher-Masoch had secretly opposed the Nazi regime in Vienna. Faithfull's father's intelligence work for the British Army brought him into contact with the family, and he thus met Eva. Faithfull's maternal grandfather had aristocratic roots in the Habsburg Dynasty, while Faithfull's maternal grandmother was Jewish.

Faithfull's maternal great-great-uncle was Leopold von Sacher-Masoch, whose erotic novel, Venus in Furs, spawned the word "masochism." In regard to her roots in the Austrian nobility, Faithfull discovered on the British television series Who Do You Think You Are? that the title used by family members was Ritter von Sacher-Masoch, the corresponding English title being that of Baronetess, a concept like an inherited knighthood.

Childhood 
Her family lived in Ormskirk, Lancashire, while her father completed a doctorate at Liverpool University. She spent some of her early life at the commune at Braziers Park, Oxfordshire, formed by John Norman Glaister, where her father, who was also instrumental in its foundation, lived and participated. Her parents divorced when she was six years old, after which she moved with her mother to Milman Road in Reading. Her primary school was in Brixton. Living in reduced circumstances, Faithfull's girlhood was marred by bouts of tuberculosis. She was a charitably subsidised (bursaried) pupil at St Joseph's Roman Catholic Convent School, Reading, where she was, for a time, a weekly boarder. While at St Joseph's, she was a member of the Progress Theatre's student group.

Singing career

1960s 

Faithfull began her singing career in 1964, landing her first gigs as a folk music performer in coffeehouses. She soon began taking part in London's exploding social scene. In early 1964 she attended a Rolling Stones launch party with artist John Dunbar and met Andrew Loog Oldham, who 'discovered' her. Her first major release, "As Tears Go By", was written and composed by Jagger, Keith Richards, and Oldham, and became a chart success. (The Rolling Stones recorded their own version one year later, which also became successful.) She then released a series of successful singles, including "This Little Bird", "Summer Nights", and "Come and Stay With Me". Faithfull married John Dunbar on 6 May 1965 in Cambridge with Peter Asher as the best man. The couple lived in a flat at 29 Lennox Gardens in Belgravia, London SW1. On 10 November 1965, she gave birth to their son, Nicholas. 

In 1966 she took Nicholas to stay with Brian Jones and Anita Pallenberg in London. During that time period, Faithfull started smoking marijuana and became best friends with Pallenberg. She also began a much-publicised relationship with Mick Jagger that same year and left her husband to live with him. The couple became a notorious part of the hip Swinging London scene. She is heard on The Beatles' song "Yellow Submarine". She was found wearing only a fur rug by police executing a drug search at Keith Richards's house in West Wittering, Sussex. In an interview 27 years later with A.M. Homes for Details, Faithfull discussed her wilder days and admitted that the drug bust fur rug incident had ravaged her personal life: "It destroyed me. To be a male drug addict and to act like that is always enhancing and glamorising. A woman in that situation becomes a slut and a bad mother." In 1968, Faithfull, by now addicted to cocaine, miscarried a daughter (whom she had named Corrina) while retreating to Jagger's country house in Ireland.

Faithfull's involvement in Jagger's life would be reflected in some of the Rolling Stones's best known songs. "Sympathy for the Devil", featured on the 1968 album Beggars Banquet, was partially inspired by The Master and Margarita, written by Mikhail Bulgakov, a book which Faithfull introduced to Jagger. The song "You Can't Always Get What You Want," on the 1969 album Let It Bleed, was supposedly written and composed about Faithfull; the songs "Wild Horses" and "I Got the Blues" on the 1971 album Sticky Fingers were also allegedly influenced by Faithfull, and she co-wrote "Sister Morphine" (the writing credit for the song was the subject of a protracted legal battle that was ultimately resolved with Faithfull listed as co-author). In her autobiography, Faithfull said Jagger and Richards released it in their own names so that her agent did not collect all the royalties and proceeds from the song, especially as she was homeless and battling with heroin addiction at the time. In 1968, Faithfull appeared in The Rolling Stones Rock and Roll Circus concert, giving a solo performance of "Something Better".

She is bisexual and during the 60s had relationships with both men and women.

1970s 
Faithfull ended her relationship with Jagger in May 1970, after initiating an affair with Anglo-Irish nobleman "Paddy" Rossmore, and she lost custody of her son in that same year, which led to her attempting suicide. Faithfull's personal life went into decline, and her career went into a tailspin. She made only a few appearances, including an October 1973 performance for NBC with David Bowie, singing Sonny & Cher's "I Got You Babe".

Faithfull lived on London's Soho streets for two years, suffering from heroin addiction and anorexia nervosa. Friends intervened and enrolled her in an NHS heroin-assisted treatment programme. She failed at controlling or stabilising her addiction at that time. In 1971, producer Mike Leander found her on the streets and made an attempt to revive her career, producing part of her album Rich Kid Blues. The album was shelved until 1985.

Severe laryngitis, coupled with persistent drug abuse during this period, permanently altered Faithfull's voice, leaving it cracked and lower in pitch. While the new sound was praised as "whisky soaked" by some critics, journalist John Jones, of the Sunday Times, wrote that she had "permanently vulgarised her voice". In 1975 she released the country-influenced record Dreamin' My Dreams (a.k.a. Faithless), which reached No.1 on the Irish Albums Chart. Faithfull moved into a squat without hot water or electricity in Chelsea with then-boyfriend Ben Brierly, of the punk band the Vibrators. She later shared flats in Chelsea and Regent's Park with Henrietta Moraes.

In 1979, the same year she was arrested for marijuana possession in Norway, Faithfull's career returned full force with the album Broken English, one of her most critically hailed albums. Partially influenced by the punk explosion and her marriage to Brierly in the same year, it ranged from the punk-pop sounds of the title track, which addressed terrorism in Europe (being dedicated to Ulrike Meinhof), to the punk-reggae rhythms of "Why D'Ya Do It?", a song with aggressive lyrics adapted from a poem by Heathcote Williams. The musical structure of this song is complex: though on the surface hard rock, it is a tango in 4/4 time, with an opening electric guitar riff by Barry Reynolds in which beats 1 and 4 of each measure are accented on the up-beat, and beat 3 is accented on the down beat. Faithfull, in her autobiography, commented that her fluid yet rhythmic reading of Williams' lyric was "an early form of rap". Broken English was also the album which revealed the full extent of Faithfull's drinking and drug use and its effect on her singing voice, with the melodic vocals on her early records being replaced by a raucous, deep voice which helped capture the raw emotions expressed in the album's songs.

1980s 
Faithfull began living in New York after the release of the follow-up to Broken English, Dangerous Acquaintances, in 1981. The same year, she appeared as a vocalist on the single "Misplaced Love" by Rupert Hine, which charted in Australia. Despite her comeback, she was still battling with addiction in the mid-1980s, at one point breaking her jaw tripping on a flight of stairs while under the influence. In another incident her heart stopped. A disastrous appearance on Saturday Night Live was blamed on too many rehearsals, but it was suspected that drugs had caused her vocal cords to seize up. Rich Kid Blues (1985) was another collection of her early work combined with new recordings, a double record showcasing both the pop and rock 'n' roll facets of her output to date. In 1985, Faithfull performed "Ballad of the Soldier's Wife" on Hal Willner's tribute album Lost in the Stars: The Music of Kurt Weill. Faithfull's restrained readings lent themselves to the material, and this collaboration informed several subsequent works.

In 1985, she was at the Hazelden Foundation Clinic in Minnesota for rehabilitation. She then received treatment at McLean Hospital in Belmont, Massachusetts. While living at a hotel in nearby Cambridge, Faithfull started an affair (while still married to Brierly) with a dual diagnosis (mentally ill and drug dependent) man, Howard Tose, who later committed suicide by jumping from a 14th floor window of the flat they shared. In 1987, Faithfull dedicated a "thank you" to Tose within the album package of Strange Weather, on the back sleeve: "To Howard Tose with love and thanks". Faithfull's divorce from Brierly was also finalised that year. In 1995, she wrote and sang about Tose's death in "Flaming September" from the album A Secret Life.

In 1987, Faithfull again reinvented herself, this time as a jazz and blues singer, on Strange Weather, also produced by Willner. The album became her most critically lauded album of the decade. Coming full circle, the renewed Faithfull cut another recording of "As Tears Go By" for Strange Weather, this time in a tighter, more gravelly voice. The singer confessed to a lingering irritation with her first hit. "I always childishly thought that was where my problems started, with that damn song," she told Jay Cocks in Time magazine, but she came to terms with it as well as with her past. In a 1987 interview with Rory O'Connor of Vogue, Faithfull declared, "forty is the age to sing it, not seventeen." The album of covers was produced by Hal Willner after the two had spent numerous weekends listening to hundreds of songs from the annals of 20th-century music. They chose to record such diverse tracks as Bob Dylan's "I'll Keep It with Mine" and "Yesterdays", written by Broadway composers Jerome Kern and Otto Harbach. The work also includes tunes first made notable by such blues luminaries as Billie Holiday and Bessie Smith; Tom Waits wrote the title track. In 1988, Faithfull married writer and actor Giorgio Della Terza, but they divorced in 1991.

1990s 
When Roger Waters assembled an all-star cast of musicians to perform the rock opera The Wall live in Berlin in July 1990, Faithfull played the part of Pink's overprotective mother. Her musical career rebounded for the third time during the early 1990s with the live album Blazing Away, which featured Faithfull revisiting songs she had performed over the course of her career. Blazing Away was recorded at St. Ann's Cathedral in Brooklyn. The 13 selections include "Sister Morphine", a cover of Edith Piaf's "Les Prisons du Roy", and "Why D'Ya Do It?" from Broken English. Alanna Nash of Stereo Review commended the musicians whom Faithfull had chosen to back her—longtime guitarist Reynolds was joined by former Band member Garth Hudson and pianist Dr. John. Nash was also impressed with the album's autobiographical tone, noting "Faithfull's gritty alto is a cracked and halting rasp, the voice of a woman who's been to hell and back on the excursion fare which, of course, she has." The reviewer extolled Faithfull as "one of the most challenging and artful of women artists," and Rolling Stone writer Fred Goodman asserted: "Blazing Away is a fine retrospective – proof that we can still expect great things from this greying, jaded contessa."

A Collection of Her Best Recordings was released in 1994 by Island Records to coincide with the release of the Faithfull autobiography; the two products originally shared the same cover art. It contained Faithfull's updated version of "As Tears Go By" from Strange Weather, several cuts from Broken English and A Child's Adventure and a song written by Patti Smith scheduled for inclusion on an Irish AIDS benefit album. This track, "Ghost Dance", suggested to Faithfull by a friend who later died of AIDS, was made with a trio of old friends: Stones' drummer Charlie Watts and guitarist Ron Wood backed Faithfull's vocals on the song, while Keith Richards coproduced it. The retrospective album also featured one live track, "Times Square", from Blazing Away as well as a new Faithfull original, "She", penned with composer and arranger Angelo Badalamenti to be released the following year on A Secret Life, with additional songs co written with Badalamenti. Faithfull also sang "Love is Teasin," an Irish folk standard, with The Chieftains on their album The Long Black Veil, released in 1995. Faithfull sang a duet and recited text on the San Francisco band Oxbow's 1997 album Serenade in Red. Faithfull also sang interlude vocals on Metallica's song "The Memory Remains" from their 1997 album Reload and appeared in the song's music video; the track reached No. 28 in the U.S. (No.3 on the U.S. Mainstream Rock chart) and No.13 in the UK.

As her fascination with the music of Weimar-era Germany continued, Faithfull performed in The Threepenny Opera at the Gate Theatre, Dublin, playing Pirate Jenny. Her interpretation of the music led to a new album, Twentieth Century Blues (1996), which focused on the music of Kurt Weill and Bertolt Brecht as well as Noël Coward, followed in 1998 by a recording of The Seven Deadly Sins, with the Vienna Radio Symphony Orchestra, conducted by Dennis Russell Davies. A hugely successful concert and cabaret tour accompanied by Paul Trueblood at the piano, culminated in the filming, at the Montreal Jazz Festival, of the DVD Marianne Faithfull Sings Kurt Weill.

In 1998, Faithfull released A Perfect Stranger: The Island Anthology, a two-disc compilation that chronicled her years with Island Records. It featured tracks from her albums Broken English, Dangerous Acquaintances, A Child's Adventure, Strange Weather, Blazing Away, and A Secret Life, as well as several B sides and unreleased tracks.

Faithfull's 1999 DVD Dreaming My Dreams contained material about her childhood and parents, with historical video footage going back to 1964 and interviews with the artist and several friends who have known her since childhood. The documentary included sections on her relationship with John Dunbar and Mick Jagger, and brief interviews with Keith Richards. It concluded with footage from a 30-minute live concert, originally broadcast on PBS for the series Sessions at West 54th. That same year, she ranked 25th in VH1's 100 Greatest Women in Rock and Roll.

Roger Waters (Pink Floyd) wrote the song "Incarceration of a Flower Child" portraying Syd Barrett in 1968; it was never recorded by Pink Floyd. The song was eventually recorded by Faithfull on her 1999 album Vagabond Ways.

2000s 

Faithfull released several albums in the 2000s that received positive critical response, beginning with Vagabond Ways (1999), which was produced and recorded by Mark Howard. It included collaborations with Daniel Lanois, Emmylou Harris, Pink Floyd's Roger Waters, and writer (and friend) Frank McGuinness. Later that year she sang "Love Got Lost" on Joe Jackson's Night and Day II.

Her renaissance continued with Kissin Time, released in 2002. The album contained songs written with Blur, Beck, Billy Corgan, Jarvis Cocker, Dave Stewart, David Courts and the French pop singer Étienne Daho. On this record, she paid tribute to Nico (with "Song for Nico"), whose work she admired. The album also included an autobiographical song she co-wrote with Cocker, called "Sliding Through Life on Charm".

In 2005, she released Before the Poison. The album was primarily a collaboration with PJ Harvey and Nick Cave, though Damon Albarn and Jon Brion also contributed. Before the Poison received mixed reviews from both Rolling Stone and Village Voice. In 2005 she recorded (and co-produced) "Lola R Forever", a cover of the Serge Gainsbourg song "Lola Rastaquouere" with Sly & Robbie for the tribute album Monsieur Gainsbourg Revisited. In 2007, Faithfull collaborated with the British singer-songwriter, Patrick Wolf on the duet "Magpie" from his third album The Magic Position and wrote and recorded a new song for the French film Truands called "A Lean and Hungry Look" with Ulysse.

In March 2007 she returned to the stage with a touring show entitled Songs of Innocence and Experience. Supported by a trio, the performance had a semi-acoustic feel and toured European theatres throughout the spring and summer. The show featured many songs she had not performed live before including "Something Better", the song she sang on The Rolling Stones Rock and Roll Circus. The show also included the Harry Nilsson song "Don't Forget Me", "Marathon Kiss" from Vagabond Ways and a version of the traditional "Spike Driver Blues".

Articles published at that time hinted Faithfull was looking to retirement and was hoping that money from Songs of the Innocence and Experience would enable her to live in comfort. She said: "I'm not prepared to be 70 and absolutely broke. I realised last year that I have no safety net at all and I'm going to have to get one. So I need to change my attitude to life, which means I have to put away 10 per cent every year of my old age. I want to be in a position where I don't have to work. I should have thought about this a long time ago but I didn't." However, she still lived in her flat in Paris
(located in one of the most expensive streets of the capital) and had a house in County Waterford, Ireland. Recording of Easy Come, Easy Go commenced in New York City on 6 December 2007; the album was produced by Hal Willner who had previously recorded Strange Weather in 1997. A version of Morrissey's "Dear God Please Help Me" from his 2006 album, Ringleader of the Tormentors is one of the songs featured. In March 2009, she performed "The Crane Wife 3" on The Late Show. In late March, she began the Easy Come, Easy Go tour, which took her to France, Germany, Austria, New York City, Los Angeles and London.

On 3 May 2009, she was featured on CBS News Sunday Morning and interviewed by Anthony Mason in the "Sunday Profile" segment. Both in-studio and on-the-street (New York City) interview segments with Faithfull and Mason were interspersed with extensive biographical and musical footage.

In November, Faithfull was interviewed by Jennifer Davies on World Radio Switzerland, where she described the challenges of being stereotyped as a "mother, or the pure wife". Because of this, she insisted, it has been hard to maintain a long career as a female artist, which, she said, gave her empathy for Amy Winehouse when they met recently.

In 2010, she was honoured with the Icon of the Year award from Q magazine.

2010s 
On 31 January 2011, Faithfull released her 18th studio album Horses and High Heels in mainland Europe with mixed reviews.

 The 13 track album contains four songs co-written by Faithfull; the rest are covers of mainly well known songs such as Dusty Springfield's "Goin' Back" and the Shangri-Las' "Past, Present, Future". A UK CD release was planned for 7 March 2011. Faithfull supported the album's release with an extensive European tour with a five-piece band, arriving in the UK on 24 May for a rare show at London's Barbican Centre, with an extra UK show at Leamington Spa on 26 May.

On 7 May 2011, she appeared on BBC Radio 2's Graham Norton Show. She reunited with Metallica in December 2011 for their 30th anniversary celebration at the Fillmore where she performed "The Memory Remains".

In 2012, Faithfull recorded a cover version of a Stevie Nicks track from the Fleetwood Mac album Tusk as part of a Fleetwood Mac tribute project. The track "Angel" was released on 14 August 2012 as part of the tribute album Just Tell Me That You Want Me.

On 22 June 2013, she made a sell-out concert appearance at the Queen Elizabeth Hall, with jazz musician Bill Frisell playing guitar, as a part of Meltdown Festival curated by Yoko Ono.

In September 2014, Faithfull released an album of all-new material, titled Give My Love to London. She started a 12-month 50th anniversary tour at the end of 2014.

During a webchat hosted by The Guardian on 1 February 2016, Faithfull revealed plans to release a live album from her 50th anniversary tour. She also had ideas for a follow-up for Give My Love to London, but had no intention of recording new material for at least a year and a half.

Faithfull's most recent album, Negative Capability, was released in November 2018. It featured Rob Ellis, Warren Ellis, Nick Cave, Ed Harcourt, and Mark Lanegan.

2020s 
A spoken word album titled She Walks in Beauty was released in May 2021. She is accompanied with musical arrangements by Warren Ellis, Brian Eno, Nick Cave and Vincent Segal. The album sees her recite the 19th-century British Romantic poets.

In 2023, Rolling Stone ranked Faithfull at number 173 on its list of the 200 Greatest Singers of All Time.

Achievements 

In 1999, Faithfull ranked 25th on VH1's 100 Greatest Women of Rock and Roll.

On 4 November 2007, the European Film Academy announced that Faithfull had received a nomination for Best Actress, for her role as Maggie in Irina Palm. At the 20th annual European Film Awards ceremony held in Berlin, on 1 December 2007, Faithfull lost to Helen Mirren.

On 5 March 2009, Faithfull received the World Arts Award for Lifetime Achievement at the 2009 Women's World Awards. "Marianne's contribution to the arts over a 45-year career including 18 studio albums as a singer, songwriter and interpreter, and numerous appearances on stage and screen is now being acknowledged with this special award." The award was presented in Vienna, with ceremonies televised in over 40 countries on 8 March 2009 as part of International Women's Day.

On 23 March 2011, Faithfull was awarded the Commandeur of the Ordre des Arts et des Lettres, one of France's highest cultural honours.

Awards and nominations
{| class="wikitable sortable plainrowheaders" 
|-
! scope="col" | Award
! scope="col" | Year
! scope="col" | Nominee(s)
! scope="col" | Category
! scope="col" | Result
! scope="col" class="unsortable"| 
|-
!scope="row"|European Film Awards
| 2007
| Irina Palm
| Best Actress
| 
| 
|-
! scope="row"|Grammy Awards
| 1981
| Broken English
| Best Female Rock Vocal Performance
| 
| 
|-
! scope="row"|Q Awards
| 2009
| Herself
| Q Icon
| 
| 
|-
!scope="row"|Women's World Award
| 2009
| Herself
| Lifetime Achievement Award
| 
|

Health 
Faithfull's touring and work schedule has been repeatedly interrupted by health problems. In late 2004 she called off the European leg of a world tour, promoting Before The Poison after collapsing on stage in Milan, and was hospitalised for exhaustion. The tour resumed later and included a US leg in 2005. In September 2006, she again called off a concert tour, this time after she was diagnosed with breast cancer. The following month, she underwent surgery in France and no further treatment was necessary owing to the tumour having been caught at a very early stage. Less than two months after she declared having beaten the disease, Faithfull made her public statement of full recovery.

In October 2007, Faithfull said she suffered from hepatitis C on the UK television programme This Morning, and that she had first been diagnosed with the condition 12 years before. She discusses both the cancer and hepatitis diagnoses in further depth in her second memoir, Memories, Dreams and Reflections. On 27 May 2008, Faithfull released the following blog posting on her MySpace page, with the headline "Tour Dates Cancelled" and credited to FR Management – the company operated by her boyfriend/manager François Ravard: "Due to general mental, physical and nervous exhaustion doctors have ordered Marianne Faithfull to immediately cease all work activities and rehabilitate. The treatment and recovery should last around six months."

In August 2013, Faithfull was forced to cancel a string of concerts in the US and Lebanon following a back injury while on holiday in California.

On 30 May 2014, Faithfull suffered a broken hip after a fall while on holiday on the Greek island of Rhodes and underwent surgery. Afterwards, an infection developed at the site of the prosthesis, causing Faithfull to cancel or postpone parts of her 50th anniversary tour for additional surgery and rehabilitation.

On 4 April 2020, it was announced that Faithfull was in hospital in London receiving treatment for pneumonia after having tested positive for COVID-19. Her management company reported that she was "stable and responding to treatment". On 21 April she was discharged following a three-week hospitalisation. In a brief statement, Faithfull publicly thanked the hospital staff who "without a doubt" saved her life. She initially thought that she would not be able to sing again after the effects of the coronavirus on her lungs and continued to suffer memory loss because of it. However, she has since been working on her breathing and undertaking singing practice as a part of her recovery.

Discography

Filmography 
 2005: Live in Hollywood (USA, 110 minutes) directed by Mark Lucas (this is the film of her concert in Spring 2005 at the Henry Fonda Theater in Los Angeles, California during the US leg of her 40th anniversary celebration tour, including the best songs from her (then) recent album Before The Poison (2005), songs such as John Lennon's "Working Class Hero" and Roger Waters's "Incarceration Of A Flower Child" and hits such as "The Ballad of Lucy Jordan", "Guilt", "As Tears Go by", "Broken English" and "Sister Morphine"; musicians: Lew Soloff, Fernando Saunders, Barry Reynolds, Courtney Williams; released by Eagle Rock Entertainment Ltd on 20 September 2005, the 2-disc (CD + DVD) set includes a 30-minute interview with Marianne Faithfull as a bonus featured on the DVD; the set includes the main concert on both DVD and CD; DVD total timing: 2h23min.; tracklisting: 1. Trouble In Mind, 2. Falling From Grace, 3. Mystery Of Love, 4. Ballad Of Lucy Jordan, 5. She, 6. No Child Of Mine, 7. Last Song, 8. Kissin' Time, 9. Times Square, 10. Working Class Hero, 11. Incarceration Of A Flower Child, 12. Strange Weather, 13. Guilt, 14. As Tears Go By, 15. Sister Morphine, 16. Crazy Love, 17. Broken English, 18. Why D'ya Do It)
 2016: Marianne Faithfull – Fleur d'âme (France, 62 minutes) directed by Sandrine Bonnaire (this is a Marianne Faithfull video portrait and interview by French actress Sandrine Bonnaire)

Acting career 
In addition to her music career, Faithfull has had a career as an actress in theatre, television and film.

Her first professional theatre appearance was in a 1967 stage adaptation of Chekhov's Three Sisters, at the Royal Court Theatre, London, in which she played Irina, co-starring with Glenda Jackson and Avril Elgar. The year before she had played herself in Jean-Luc Godard's film Made in U.S.A.. Faithfull featured in the 1967 film I'll Never Forget What's'isname, Orson Welles receiving top billing, opposite Oliver Reed, notably becoming the first actor to use "fuck" in the dialogue of a mainstream studio picture. In the French television film Anna, starring Anna Karina, Faithfull sang Serge Gainsbourg's "Hier ou Demain". 1968 found a fetishist portrayal, a black leather-clad motorcyclist in the French film La Motocyclette (English titles: The Girl on a Motorcycle and Naked Under Leather) opposite Alain Delon, and 1969 Kenneth Anger's Lucifer Rising, her role Lilith. In London 1969 at the Round House, Faithfull played Ophelia to Nicol Williamson's title role in Hamlet. The production was filmed, Hamlet, Tony Richardson director.

Her stage work also included Edward Bond's Early Morning at the Royal Court Theatre, London, in which she played a lesbian Florence Nightingale, The Collector at St Martin's Theatre in the West End opposite Simon Williams, Mad Dog at Hampstead Theatre opposite Denholm Elliott, A Patriot for Me by John Osborne, at the Palace Theatre, Watford and the role of Lizzie Curry in N. Richard Nash's The Rainmaker, which toured the UK and in which Faithfull's co-star was Peter Gilmore. Other film roles in the 1970s included Sophy Kwykwer in Stephen Weeks's Ghost Story (AKA Madhouse Mansion), released on a newly mastered DVD in the UK in 2009, and Helen Rochefort in Assault on Agathon.

Her television acting in the late 1960s and early 1970s included The Door of Opportunity (1970) with Ian Ogilvy, adapted from W. Somerset Maugham's story, followed by August Strindberg's The Stronger (1971) with Britt Ekland, and Terrible Jim Fitch (1971) by James Leo Herlihy, which once more paired Faithfull with Nicol Williamson.

In 1991, she played the role of Pirate Jenny in The Threepenny Opera at the Gate Theatre in Dublin. Later she performed Kurt Weill's "The Seven Deadly Sins" with the Vienna Radio Symphony Orchestra, a CD of which was released in 1998.

She has played both God and the Devil. She appeared as God in two guest appearances in the British sitcom Absolutely Fabulous opposite friend Jennifer Saunders, with another close friend, Anita Pallenberg, playing the Devil. In 2004 and 2005, she played the Devil in William Burroughs' and Tom Waits' musical, The Black Rider, directed by Robert Wilson, which opened at London's Barbican Theatre, toured to San Francisco, but from which she was forced to withdraw prior to performances at the Sydney Festival, owing to exhaustion.

In 2001 Faithfull appeared with Lucy Russell and Lambert Wilson in C.S. Leigh's Far From China. She has also appeared in Patrice Chéreau's Intimacy (2001) and, in 2004, in Jose Hayot's Nord-Plage. Faithfull appeared as Empress Maria Theresa in Sofia Coppola's 2006 biopic, Marie Antoinette. She starred in the film Irina Palm, released at the Berlinale film festival in 2007. Faithfull plays the central role of Maggie, a 60-year-old widow who becomes a sex worker to pay for medical treatment for her ill grandson.

Faithfull lent her voice to the 2008 film Evil Calls: The Raven, although this was recorded several years earlier when the project was still titled Alone in the Dark. She has appeared in the 2008 feature documentary by Nik Sheehan on Brion Gysin and the dreamachine, entitled FLicKeR.

In 2008, Faithfull toured readings of Shakespeare's sonnets, drawing on the "Dark Lady" sequence. Her accompanist was the cellist Vincent Ségal.

In 2011 and 2012 Faithfull had supporting roles in the films Faces in the Crowd and Belle du Seigneur.

Faithfull starred in a production of Kurt Weill's The Seven Deadly Sins at Landestheater Linz, Austria. The production ran from October 2012 to January 2013.

On 18 September 2013, Faithfull was featured in the genealogy documentary series, Who Do You Think You Are?, tracing her family's roots, in particular her mother's side of the family in pre World War II Austria.

TV and filmography

Stage work

Work as an author
 Faithfull: An Autobiography, Marianne Faithfull (1994), Cooper Square Press
 Memories, Dreams & Reflections, Marianne Faithfull (7 July 2008), Harper Perennial
 Marianne Faithfull: A Life on Record, edited by Marianne Faithfull and Francois Ravard, Contribution by Will Self and Terry Southern, Introduction by Salman Rushdie (2014), Rizzoli

References

Further reading
 Stieven-Taylor, Alison (2007). Rock Chicks:The Hottest Female Rockers from the 1960s to Now. SYD. Rockpool Publishing. 
 "As years go by." The Independent, 1 September 1996, p. 18. An interview with Faithfull in which she specifically denies the notorious Mars Bar incident.
 Epinions.com entry on Marianne Faithfull

External links 

 
 
 
 Marianne Faithfull fansite
 Faithfull Forever – Inspired by Marianne Faithfull
 Innocence and Experience: Marianne Faithfull at Tate Gallery Liverpool

1946 births
Dark cabaret musicians
Decca Records artists
Deram Records artists
English autobiographers
English sopranos
English contraltos
English diarists
English film actresses
English people of Austrian descent
English people of Jewish descent
Women rock singers
English rock musicians
Island Records artists
Living people
London Records artists
Mick Jagger
People educated at St Joseph's Convent School
People from Hampstead
People from Reading, Berkshire
RCA Records artists
The Rolling Stones
Virgin Records artists
Women diarists
Austrian nobility
20th-century English actresses
20th-century English women singers
20th-century English singers
20th-century English writers
21st-century English actresses
21st-century English writers
21st-century English women singers
21st-century English singers
Actresses from London
Singers from London
Writers from London
McLean Hospital patients
Naïve Records artists
Anti- (record label) artists
Women punk rock singers
Love Da Records artists
Women in punk
Bisexual women
Bisexual musicians